Christian Hirte (born 23 May 1976) is a German lawyer and politician of the Christian Democratic Union (CDU) who has been serving as member of the German Bundestag since 2008. Since 2020, he has been the chairman of CDU in Thuringia. 

From 2018 to 2020, Hirte served as Parliamentary State Secretary in the Federal Ministry for Economic Affairs and Energy and additionally as commissioner of the federal government for the new states in the government of Chancellor Angela Merkel.

Education and early career
Hirte studied law at the University of Jena with a scholarship from the Konrad Adenauer Foundation and passed the first state examination in 2001 and the second in 2003. In 2004 he became an associate in the law firm Dr. Muth & Partner in Fulda, and specialized in tax law.

Political career
Hirte joined the centre-right Junge Union in 1993 and the CDU in 1995. 

Hirte has been a member of the Bundestag since 2008. In parliament, he has served on the Committee on the Environment, Nature Conservation and Nuclear Safety (2008-2013), the Committee on Tourism (2009-2013), the Budget Committee (2013-2017) and the Audit Committee (2013-2017). On the Budget Committee, he was his parliamentary group's rapporteur on the annual budget of the Federal Ministry of the Environment, Nature Conservation and Nuclear Safety.

In the negotiations to form a coalition government under the leadership of Chancellor Angela Merkel following the 2017 federal elections, Hirte was part of the CDU delegation. Following the formation of the government, he became Parliamentary State Secretary under the leadership of minister Peter Altmaier. As federal commissioner for the new states, he advocated increased focus on rehabilitating and compensating victims of the East German Communist Party.

For the 2021 elections, Hirte was elected to lead the CDU campaign in Thuringia. Following the elections, he unsuccessfully ran for a position as one of the CDU/CSU parliamentary group’s deputy chairs; in an internal vote, he lost against Sepp Müller.

Thuringia affair
Hirte was removed from his office as Parliamentary State Secretary and commissioner for the new states after he posted a congratulatory message on Twitter to FDP politician Thomas Kemmerich for his election as Minister-President in Hirte's home state of Thuringia. Kemmerich had been elected with the votes of the CDU, the FDP and the AfD, marking the first time a Minister-President has been elected with the votes of the AfD. Due to AfD's involvement, the election was widely condemned, including by Chancellor Merkel and CDU leader Annegret Kramp-Karrenbauer. Hirte's dismissal was condemned by the Values Union, a faction within CDU, which defended him and accused Merkel of silencing party critics.

Other activities

Corporate boards
 Klinikum Bad Salzungen, Member of the Supervisory Board

Non-profit organizations
 Gegen Vergessen – Für Demokratie, Member of the Board (since 2018)
 Point Alpha Stiftung, Member of the Advisory Board
 German Bishops' Conference, Member of the Working Group on Ecology (2013-2016)

Political positions
In June 2017, Hirte voted against Germany’s introduction of same-sex marriage.

Ahead of the Christian Democrats’ leadership election in 2021, Hirte expressed support for a candidacy of Ralph Brinkhaus. In the run-up to the Christian Democrats’ leadership election in 2022, he publicly endorsed Friedrich Merz to succeed Armin Laschet as the party’s chair.

Personal life
Hirte is Catholic, married and has three children.

References

External links 

 Official website

1976 births
Members of the Bundestag for Thuringia
Living people
Members of the Bundestag 2021–2025
Members of the Bundestag 2017–2021
Members of the Bundestag 2013–2017
Members of the Bundestag 2009–2013
Parliamentary State Secretaries of Germany
Members of the Bundestag for the Christian Democratic Union of Germany